The 2007–08 Dallas Mavericks season was their 28th season in the NBA. The Mavericks made the playoffs, but were eliminated in the first round for the second straight season by the New Orleans Hornets. A day later, Avery Johnson was relieved of his duties, finishing with the highest winning percentage for a coach in franchise history and replaced by former NBA Coach of the Year, Rick Carlisle. The Mavericks had the eighth best team offensive rating in the NBA.

The Mavericks acquired Jason Kidd in a mid-season trade which sent Devin Harris to the New Jersey Nets.

Key dates prior to the start of the season:
 The 2007 NBA draft took place in New York City on June 28.
 The free agency period begins in July.

Offseason

Draft picks
Dallas' selections from the 2007 NBA draft in New York City.

Roster

Regular season

Standings

Record vs. opponents

Game log

October
Record: 1–0; Home: 0–0; Road: 1–0

November
Record: 10–5; Home: 8–1 ; Road: 2–4

December 
Record: 9–6; Home: 6–2; Road: 3–4

January 
Record: 11–3; Home: 6–0; Road: 5–3

February 
Record: 8–6; Home: 5–0; Road: 3–6

March 
Record: 7–8; Home: 5–4; Road: 2–4

April 
Record: 5–3; Home: 4–0; Road: 1–3

 Green background indicates win.
 Red background indicates loss.

Playoffs

|- align="center" bgcolor="#ffcccc"
| 1 || April 19 || @ New Orleans || L 92–104 || Dirk Nowitzki (31) || Dirk Nowitzki (10) || Jason Kidd (9) ||New Orleans Arena17,446 || 0–1
|- align="center" bgcolor="#ffcccc"
| 2 || April 22 || @ New Orleans || L 103–127 || Dirk Nowitzki (27) || Brandon Bass (8) || Jason Kidd (8) ||New Orleans Arena17,855 || 0–2
|- align="center" bgcolor="#ccffcc"
| 3 || April 25 || New Orleans || W 97–87 || Dirk Nowitzki (32) || Dirk Nowitzki (19) || Nowitzki, Terry (6) ||American Airlines Center20,839 || 1–2
|- align="center" bgcolor="#ffcccc"
| 4 || April 27 || New Orleans || L 84–97 || Dirk Nowitzki (22) || Dirk Nowitzki (13) || three players tied (3) ||American Airlines Center20,644 || 1–3
|- align="center" bgcolor="#ffcccc"
| 5 || April 29 || @ New Orleans || L 94–99 || Dirk Nowitzki (22) || Dirk Nowitzki (13) || Kidd, Terry (9) ||New Orleans Arena18,260 || 1–4
|-

Player stats

Regular season

*Total for entire season including previous team(s)

Playoffs

Awards and records

Records

Milestones

Transactions
The Mavericks have been involved in the following transactions during the 2007–08 season.

Trades

Free agents

See also
 2007–08 NBA season

Reference list

Dallas Mavericks seasons
2007–08 NBA season by team
Dallas
Dallas